Dasabad (also Romanized as Dāsābād; also known as Dāskābād) is a village in Siyah Banuiyeh Rural District, in the Central District of Rabor County, Kerman Province, Iran. At the 2006 census, its population was 65, in 20 families.

References 

Populated places in Rabor County